Tartarocyon is an extinct genus of Amphicyonidae, who lived during the late Middle Miocene. It was described after fossilized remains found in Sallespisse, France. Despite the scarceness of its fossil remains, being only known from the holotype mandible, its body mass has been estimated to be close to 200 kilograms, far from its closest relative, Cynelos, and making it one of the largest terrestrial predators of Miocene Europe. T. cazanavei is the only species included in the genus. The genus was named after a southwestern French Pyrenees legend of a man eating giant ; the species name honors the owner of the terrain in which the holotype has been discovered.

References

Serravallian
Miocene mammals of Europe
Miocene bear dogs
Fossils of France
Neogene France
Fossil taxa described in 2022
Prehistoric carnivoran genera